Savion Glover (born November 19, 1973) is an American tap dancer, actor, and choreographer.

Early life
The youngest of three sons, Glover was born to a white father, who left the family before he was born, and a black mother. Glover's great grandfather on his mother's side, Dick Lundy, was a shortstop in the Negro leagues. He managed eleven Negro league baseball teams, including the Newark Eagles. His grandfather, Bill Lewis, was a big band pianist and vocalist. His grandmother, Anna Lundy Lewis, was the minister of music at New Hope Baptist Church in Newark, New Jersey. She played for Whitney Houston when she was singing in the gospel choir, and was the one who first noticed Savion's musical talent. She once held him and hummed some rhythms to him, and he smiled and joined along. Glover graduated from Newark Arts High School in 1991.

Career
Glover stated that his style is "young and funk." When asked to describe what funk is, he says it is the bass line. "Funk is anything that gets one's head on beat. It is riding with the rhythm. It is a pulse that keeps one rolling with the beat." Gregory Hines, a tap legend, was one of Glover's tap teachers. Hines stated that "Savion is possibly the best tap dancer that ever lived." Glover liked to start his pieces with some old school moves from famous tappers and then work his way into his own style. Hines said it is like paying homage to those he respects. When Honi Coles died, Savion performed at his memorial service. He finished his dance with a famous Coles move:  a backflip into a split from standing position, then getting up without using one's hands. Glover rarely does this move because it wasn't his style, but he did it because it was Coles' style that he wanted to keep alive. "I feel like it's one of my responsibilities to keep the style." Henry LeTang called Glover "the Sponge" because he learned very quickly with everything thrown at him. LeTang taught the Hines brothers back in the 1950s and taught Glover for a little while before having him work for "Black and Blue," a tap revue in Paris in 1987. Many legendary tappers taught Glover such as LeTang, the Hines brothers, Jimmy Slyde, Dianne Walker, Chuck Green, Lon Chaney (Isaiah Chaneyfield), Honi Coles, Sammy Davis Jr., Buster Brown, Howard Sims, and Arthur Duncan.

Teaching
He has been teaching tap since he was 14 years old. Glover created Real Tap Skills, and started HooFeRz Club School for Tap in Newark, New Jersey. Wanting to bring back the real essence of  At age seven, Glover drummed in a group called Three Plus One. In the group, he demanded that he dance while he played the drum. Glover has a heavy foot for tap. He dances hard and loud in every step, and teaches his students how to "hit," a term related to one's ability to express oneself, complete a tap sequence, or say something.

Choreography

Notable choreographed pieces

Bring in 'Da Noise, Bring in 'Da Funk
Savion Glover's Nu York, ABC special
ABC opening to Monday Night Football
The Rat Pack, HBO movie
Created a dance company called NYOTs (Not Your Ordinary Tappers)
PBS for President Clinton in Savion Glover's Stomp, Slide, and Swing: In Performances in the Whitehouse
Savion Glover/Downtown: Live Communication
Shuffle Along, or, the Making of the Musical Sensation of 1921 and All That Followed

When Glover choreographs a piece, he improvises as he generates a dance sequence. As he finds rhythms, he listens for new sounds at many points on the stage. "I'm feelin' the stage for sounds. You might find a spot on it that gives you that bass; you might find a spot on the floor that gives you that dead type tom-tom sound." "I think what makes Savion an incredible artist is his extraordinary joy in what he does. He is able to live in that state of joy and not compromise his emotional complexity like the earlier tap dancers had to," says George C. Wolfe.

Broadway

The Tap Dance Kid (1985)
This musical was based on the 1974 novel Nobody's Family is Going to Change by Louise Fitzhugh. Glover's Broadway debut, at the age of 11, was as a replacement with this show. The musical was choreographed by Danny Daniels, with direction by Vivian Matalon; the music was by Henry Krieger and lyrics by Robert Lorick. Reviews of this show were mediocre. The New York Times claimed it was a traditional story to give children a dream to look forward to, but was not anything exceptional. However, the musical went on to be nominated for seven Tony Awards, including Best Musical.

Black and Blue (1989)
Performed at the age of 15. For this performance, he became one of the youngest performers ever nominated for a Tony Award.

Jelly's Last Jam (1992)
In Jelly's Last Jam (1992), the tap dancing was choreographed by Ted Levy and Gregory Hines, who starred as Jelly Roll Morton. Glover played the role of "Young Jelly",
and was nominated for the Drama Desk Award as Outstanding Featured Actor in a Musical.

Bring in 'Da Noise, Bring in 'Da Funk (1996)
Glover performed in this musical and also choreographed it. He was nominated for the Tony Award, Actor in a Musical for his roles as Lil' Dahlin' and 'da Beat and for Choreography. "Mr. Glover meticulously and respectfully demonstrates the techniques made famous by each, then blends them all into an exultant stylistic brew that belongs to no one but him. As dance, as musical, as theater, as art, as history and entertainment, there's nothing Noise/Funk cannot and should not do." -The New York Times.

Shuffle Along, or, the Making of the Musical Sensation of 1921 and All That Followed (2016)
Glover choreographed the musical Shuffle Along, or, the Making of the Musical Sensation of 1921 and All That Followed, which opened in 2016 at the Music Box Theatre. He has been nominated for a Tony Award for Best Choreography and a Drama Desk Award for his work on the musical.

Filmography

Film
1988 - Driving Me Crazy, Audition artist, First Run
1989 - Tap, as Louis, TriStar
2000 - Bamboozled, as Manray/Mantan, New Line
2001 - The Making of Bamboozled
2000 - Barbra Streisand's "Timeless"
2006 - Happy Feet, choreography and motion capture for "Mumble"
2011 - Happy Feet 2, choreography for "Mumble"

Television
Shangri-La Plaza, 1990 CBS pilot
Sesame Street (1990–95) (also known as Les amis de Sesame, Canadian Sesame Street, The New Sesame Street, Open Sesame, and Sesame Park), as Savion, on PBS
Dance in America: Tap!
Black Film Makers Hall of Fame
The Kennedy Center Honors
Academy Awards Ceremony (1996) for Tom  Hanks tribute
The Wall, as Bracey Mitchell, 1998 Showtime TV movie
The Rat Pack, as the choreographer, 1998 HBO TV movie
Bojangles, as Newcomer, 2001 Showtime TV movie
So You Think You Can Dance: The Next Generation (2016) - Choreographer
The Talk (2018) - Routine with co-host Sheryl Underwood as part of the show's New Year's Evolution

Episodic
1987 - Super Dave
1998 - Sin City Spectacular (also known as Penn & Teller's Sin City Spectacular), FX
1999 - The Jamie Foxx Show, "Taps for Royal," The WB
1999 - Saturday Night Live, (Uncredited), NBC
2000 - Odyssey, America!
2003 - Cedric the Entertainer Presents, Bartholomew, Fox

TV specials
1989 - Tap Dance in America (also known as Gregory Hines' Tap Dance in America), PBS
1991 - The Kennedy Center Honors: A Celebration of the Performing Arts, CBS
1992 - Macy's Thanksgiving Day Parade, NBC
1992 - Jammin': Jelly Roll Morton on Broadway (documentary), PBS
1993 - Sesame Street Stays Up Late! (also known as Sesame Street Stays Up Late! A Monster New Year's Eve Party), as Savion, PBS
1994 - Sesame Street's All-Star 25th Birthday: Stars and Street Forever!, ABC
1994 - In a New Light `94, ABC
1995 - The Kennedy Center Honors: A Celebration of the Performing Arts, CBS
1996 - Vanessa Williams & Friends: Christmas in New York, ABC
1997 - It Just Takes One, USA
1997 - 53rd Presidential Inaugural Gala, CBS
1998 - Slide and Swing with Savion Glover, Stomp, PBS
1998 - Savion Glover's Nu York, as the Host, ABC
1998 - Savion Glover's Nu York, Executive producer and choreographer, ABC
1998 - The First 50 Years, Quincy Jones, ABC
1998 - The New Jersey Performing Arts Center Opening Night Gala, PBS,
1999 - Disney's Young Musicians Symphony Orchestra in Concert, Disney Channel
1999- The Jamie Foxx Show
2000 - The Steadfast Tin Soldier: An Animated Special from the "Happily Ever After: Fairy Tales for Every Child" Series (animated), the voice of toy dancer, HBO
2001 - Barbra Streisand-Timeless, Brother Time, Fox
2001 - Barbra Streisand-Timeless, as the choreographer, Fox
2002 - Olympic Winter Games, Closing ceremony, NBC
2002 - AFI Life Achievement Award: A Tribute to Tom Hanks, USA

Awards presentations
1989 - The 61st Annual Academy Awards Presentation, ABC
1989 - 16th Annual Black Filmmakers Hall of Fame, syndicated
1996 - The 68th Annual Academy Awards Presentation, ABC
1997 - Launching the Tonys, as the Presenter, Broadway `97, PBS
1997 - The 51st Annual Tony Awards, CBS
1997 - 39th Grammy Awards, CBS
1998 - The 13th Annual Stellar Gospel Music Awards, syndicated
1998 - 12th Annual Soul Train Music Awards, syndicated
1999 - 30th NAACP Image Awards, Fox
2001 - The 32nd NAACP Image Awards, Fox

Music videos
2001 - "Timeless: Live in Concert", Brother Time
Also appeared in the music video "Attack Me with Your Love" by Cameo  (1985)
Also appeared in the music video "Havana" by Kenny G
Also appeared in the music video "It's All About the Benjamins" by Puff Daddy and the Family

Stage appearances
1984 - The Tap Dance Kid, (Broadway debut) Title character
1989–91- Black and Blue, Minskoff Theatre, Broadway
1992–93 - Jelly's Last Jam, as Young Jelly, Virginia Theatre, Broadway
1996–97 - Bring in da Noise, Bring in da Funk, Ambassador Theatre, Broadway
1998 - Savion Glover: Downtown, Variety Arts Theatre, New York City
1999 - Keep Bangin′, Players Theatre, New York City
2001 - Foot Notes, Wilshire Theatre, Los Angeles
2002 - Savion Glover with TiDii the Egg, Empire State Plaza, Albany, NY

Tours
 2000 - Foot Notes, The Concert, U. S. cities 
2002 - Bring in da Noise, Bring in da Funk, U.S. cities/international cities
Also toured U.S. cities in Jelly's Last Jam
2013 - Stepz, U.S. cities/London

Albums
1989 - Black and Blue (original cast recording), DRG
1992 - Jelly's Last Jam (original cast recording), Mercury
1995 - Hot Jazz for a Cool Yule, Pacific Vista Productions
1996 - Bring in da Noise, Bring in da Funk (original cast recording), RCAVictor
1996 - "Prince: Joint 2 Joint" (tap dance breakdown), from the album Emancipation
2002 - "Talib Kweli-Stand 2 the side", from the album Quality

Publications

Books
1997 - Contemporary Black Biography, Volume 14, Gale
1997 - Newsmakers, Issue 4, Gale
2000 - Savion! My Life in Tap, with Bruce Weber, HarperCollins

Periodicals
November 1994 Dance Magazine
April 1996 Dance Magazine
May 23, 1998 TV Guide, p. 6

Awards
1996 - Tony Award for Best Choreography for Bring in 'Da Noise, Bring in 'Da Funk
1992 - Dance Magazine Award for choreography, making him the youngest recipient in N.E.A. history.

See also
 List of dancers

References

Sources
 Brantley, Ben, "THEATER REVIEW;Story of Tap as the Story of Blacks", Rev. of Broadway. The New York Times, November 16, 1995. Retrieved February 13, 2011.
 Filmbug. "Savion Glover". Filmbug Movie Stars. New Line Cinema, January 1, 2000. Retrieved February 13, 2011.
 Hill, Constance Valis, "Tap Dancing America". Oxford University Press. Retrieved February 10, 2011.
 Kisselgoff, Anna. "DANCE VIEW; Elegant Ghosts Haunt 'Black and Blue'", New York Times, May 21, 1989. Retrieved February 14, 2011.
 Lahr, John. Light Fantastic: Adventures in Theatre. New York: Dial, 1996. Print.
 "Savion Glover Biography (1973-)". Film Reference. NetIndustries, LLC. January 1, 2010. Retrieved February 14, 2011.
 Rich, Frank. "STAGE: A BOY AND HIS DREAMS IN 'TAP DANCE KID'", Rev. of Broadway. The New York Times, December 22, 1983. Retrieved February 12, 2011.

External links

 
 
 
 Archival footage of Savion Glover performing in 2002 at Jacob's Pillow
 Archival footage of Savion Glover performing in 2005 at Jacob's Pillow

1973 births
Living people
20th-century American male actors
African-American choreographers
African-American male actors
African-American male child actors
African-American male dancers
American choreographers
American male child actors
American male dancers
American male film actors
American male musical theatre actors
American male stage actors
American male television actors
American tap dancers
Drama Desk Award winners
History of Newark, New Jersey
Male actors from New Jersey
Male actors from Newark, New Jersey
Musicians from Newark, New Jersey
Newark Arts High School alumni
Tony Award winners